Julian L. McPhillips, Jr. (born November 13, 1946, Birmingham, Alabama) is a U.S. lawyer and was a candidate for Attorney General of Alabama in 1978. In 2002, McPhillips lost out in the Democratic nomination to challenge first-term Republican incumbent Jeff Sessions for a U.S. Senate seat in Alabama.

Early life
Julian McPhillips is the son of (died February 13, 2001) an Episcopalian priest, and Eleanor Elizabeth (née Dixon; died December 1, 2002). He was born in Birmingham, Alabama but raised in Cullman.

His father served in the U.S. Navy during World War II. Julian was an All-American collegiate wrestler at Princeton, twice Eastern AAU heavyweight wrestling champion, and a finalist in the 1972 Olympic Tryouts.

Political and law career
Julian worked as a Wall Street attorney, from 1971 to 1975. He moved back to Alabama in 1975 and began working as Assistant Attorney General under Alabama Attorney General Bill Baxley, specializing in white collar crime prosecution. He left in 1977 and began a campaign for Attorney General that year where he would finish second out of nine candidates for Attorney General in the unofficial results in 1978. He lost his run-off spot in the late changing official vote three days later. After the loss, McPhillips went into private practice.

In 2002, McPhillips  lost out in the Democratic nomination to challenge the first-term Republican incumbent, Senator Jeff Sessions for a senate seat in Alabama. He won many counties in the southern part of the state, but Susan Parker won the most counties and Wayne Sowell endorsed Parker for the run off. Parker then lost to Jeff Sessions  in the United States Senate election in Alabama in 2002. McPhillips is an opponent of abortion on demand. 

His brother, Frank D. McPhillips is an attorney in Birmingham, Alabama, a Democrat and a delegate to the 2008 Democratic National Convention.

References

1946 births
Living people
Alabama Democrats
Alabama lawyers
American Episcopalians
People from Cullman, Alabama
Princeton University alumni
Columbia Law School alumni